Scouting and Guiding in Andorra is currently represented by a single coeducational Scout and Guide group, based in Sant Julià de Lòria and founded in 2016.

History 
Until 2016, Andorra was one of only six of the world's independent countries that do not have Scouting. The former Scout association of the country in the Pyrenees, Scouts d'Andorra, has been dormant since the 1980s. At least one group was known to be sponsored by Collège Mare Janer private school, run along the lines of the Scouts of Europe method.

The principality issued Scout Centenary stamps for the 2007 celebration, through both French and Spanish posts.

The Minyons Escoltes i Guies de Catalunya, a Catalan Scouting organization, undertook a study on the possibilities for Scout groups in Andorra in summer 2007. Activities were started in 2008 and are supervised by the European Scout Region. As of August 2012, this was without success.

References

Andorra
Disbanded Scouting organizations